Raditsa-Krylovka is an urban locality (urban-type settlement) under the administrative jurisdiction of the town of oblast significance of Bryansk of Bryansk Oblast, Russia. Population:

References

Notes

Sources

Urban-type settlements in Bryansk Oblast